Paulin Puel (born 9 May 1997) is a French footballer who plays as a striker for Avranches.

Club career
Born in Nice, Puel spent his youth career at Lille, Lyon and OGC Nice, all under the management of his father Claude. He made his Ligue 1 debut on 20 April 2014 against AS Monaco, replacing Valentin Eysseric after 88 minutes in a 1–0 away defeat.

After some months at Monaco, where he was mainly in the youth team and played a small part in the reserve team, Puel joined Avranches of the third-tier Championnat National in August 2018.

Personal life
Puel is the son of the French manager and former footballer Claude Puel, and younger brother of the footballer Grégoire Puel. All three were colleagues at Nice.

Career statistics

References

External links
 

1997 births
Living people
Footballers from Nice
French footballers
Association football forwards
Ligue 1 players
Championnat National players
Championnat National 2 players
Championnat National 3 players
OGC Nice players
US Avranches players